The Supreme Court of the State of North Carolina is the state of North Carolina's highest appellate court. Until the creation of the North Carolina Court of Appeals in the 1960s, it was the state's only appellate court. The Supreme Court consists of six associate justices and one chief justice, although the number of justices has varied from time to time.  The primary function of the Supreme Court is to decide questions of law that have arisen in the lower courts and before state administrative agencies.

History

The first North Carolina appellate court, created in 1799, was called the Court of Conference and consisted of several North Carolina Superior Court (trial) judges sitting en banc twice each year to review appeals from their courts.  In 1805 it was named the Supreme Court, and a seal and motto were to be procured.

From the time the North Carolina General Assembly created the Court as a distinct body in 1818 until 1868, the members of the Court were chosen by the General Assembly and served for life, or "during good behavior."  The legislature appointed John Louis Taylor, Leonard Henderson, and John Hall as the first Supreme Court judges.  The three judges were allowed to select their own Chief Justice, and they chose Taylor.  The Court first met on January 1, 1819.

Since the adoption of the 1868 state constitution, each justice has been elected (separately, including a distinct Chief Justice position) by the people to an eight-year term.  There are no term limits, but there are age limits of 72.  The General Assembly made Supreme Court elections non-partisan starting with the 2004 elections, but later made them partisan again after the 2016 elections.

Susie Sharp became the court's first female justice in 1962 (and later, she became its first female chief justice). In 2011, the court had a female majority for the first time (that majority ended in 2014 with the retirement of Chief Justice Sarah Parker).

The Supreme Court is housed in the Law and Justice Building, located across from the North Carolina State Capitol in Raleigh, North Carolina. The building was built in 1940 and underwent major renovations in 2005–2007.

In 1975, a new seal was adopted.  The old Latin phrase Suum cuique was amended to Suum cuique tribuere.

Bayard v. Singleton (1787)

The court's controversial 1787 decision in Bayard v. Singleton is among its most significant. Bayard, involving a dispute over property confiscated during the Revolutionary War, was the first ruling in America to declare a legislative act unconstitutional, thus establishing the principle of judicial review. Judicial review was later adopted by the U.S. Supreme Court in Marbury v. Madison (1803).  The ruling led to a discussion between Supreme Court justice James Iredell and Founding Father Richard Dobbs Spaight as to the proper role of judges in the Constitutional Republic, leaving Spaight questioning if a court had a right to overturn the legislation.

Bayard involved a host of North Carolina's Revolutionary Era luminaries: future U.S. Supreme Court Justice Alfred Moore argued the case on behalf of the state, and the opinion was written by future Governor of North Carolina Samuel Ashe.

Though Bayard was technically decided by the North Carolina Superior Court, before the Supreme Court of North Carolina was established, it is now widely attributed to the current supreme court.

Justices

Current justices

The Court's current members are:

Chief justices
Note that dates are for service as chief justice only.  Many chief justices have also served as associate justices.

 John Louis Taylor (1818–1829)
 Leonard Henderson (1829–1833)
 Thomas Ruffin (1833–1852)
 Frederick Nash (1852–1858)
 Richmond Mumford Pearson (1858–1878)
 William Nathan Harrell Smith (1878–1889)
 Augustus Summerfield Merrimon (1889–1892)
 James E. Shepherd (1893–1895)
 William T. Faircloth (1895–1901)
 David M. Furches (1901–1903)
 Walter Clark (1903–1924)
 William A. Hoke (1924–1925)
 Walter P. Stacy (1925–1951)
 William A. Devin (1951–1954)
 M.V. Barnhill (1954–1956)
 J. Wallace Winborne (1956–1962)
 Emery B. Denny (1962–1966)
 R. Hunt Parker (1966–1969)
 William H. Bobbitt (1969–1974)
 Susie Sharp (1975–1979)
 Joseph Branch (1979–1986)
 Rhoda Billings (1986)
 James G. Exum (1986–1995)
 Burley Mitchell (1995–1999)
 Henry Frye (1999–2001)
 I. Beverly Lake Jr. (2001–2006)
 Sarah Parker (2006–2014)
 Mark Martin (2014–2019)
 Cheri Beasley (2019–2020)
 Paul Newby (2021–present)

See also
 North Carolina Court of Appeals

Notes

External links 
 North Carolina Supreme Court official page
 History of the NC Supreme Court
 Video: Reflections on the History of the Supreme Court of North Carolina
 History of the Supreme Court by Chief Justice Walter Clark (1919)
 NC Supreme Court Historical Society
 NC Manual of 1913 by Robert Digges Wimberly Connor

North Carolina state courts
 
North Carolina
1818 establishments in North Carolina
Courts and tribunals established in 1818